Edge banding or edgebanding is the name of both a process and an associated narrow strip of material used to create durable and aesthetically pleasing trim edges during finish carpentry.

Edge banding is used to cover the exposed sides of materials such as plywood, particle board or MDF, increasing durability and giving the appearance of a solid or more valuable material. Common substitutes for edge banding include face frames or molding. Edge banding can be made of different materials including PVC, ABS, acrylic, melamine, wood or wood veneer.

Traditional edge banding was a manual process requiring ordinary carpentry tools and materials.  In modern applications, particularly for high-volume, repetitive manufacturing steps such as cabinet doors, edge banding is applied to the substrate by an automated process using a hot-melt adhesive. Hot melt adhesives may consist of various raw materials including EVA, PUR, PA, APOA, and PO. A substrate primer may also be used as a bonding agent between the adhesive and the substrate. Thicker edge bandings typically require a slight concavity to provide a tight glue line. The thickness can vary from .018" to 5mm or even more. The machine that applies the edge banding is called edge bander. An edge bander bonds the edge banding to the substrate, trims the leading and trailing edges, trims top and bottom flush with the substrate, scraps any surplus, and buffs the finished edge.

Thermoplastic dge banding is produced with an extruder, a machine that consists of a loading system for raw materials, a screw inside a barrel that melts and transports the raw materials (plastics PVC, ABS, PP, PMMA and color pigments) through a die which shapes the edge banding into the required size. After the Edge banding is extruded, it can be texturized, printed, and lacquered to provide the required finish. The edge banding is then rolled and send to customers.

See also 
 Cabinet making
 Inlay
 Bead (woodworking)
 Binding (woodworking), on the end-grain of solid wood, to reduce changes in humidity.

Woodworking